Pudukkadai  is a village located in Cuddalore Taluka of Cuddalore district of Tamil Nadu state, it is located 14 km from headquarters Cuddalore and 168 km from State capital Chennai. The nearby cities are Pondicherry , Cuddalore, Vadalur and  Nellikuppam.

Demographics
Tamil is the local language spoken in this village, there are 464 families residing in this village with an average population of 1892 out of which 951 are male and 941 are female.

Administration
Pudukkadai is administered by the  Sarpanch who is the head of the village and he is the elected representative of  village

Commute
This place could be reached via train or bus, and the nearest railway station are the Villianur railway station  and the Chinna Babu Samudram railway station.The nearest bus stops are Pudukadai Alamaram Bus Stop, Pudukadai Bus Stop, Perungalur Bus Stop and Theduvar Natham Bus Stop.

References

Villages in Cuddalore district